Melanaethus is a genus of burrowing bugs in the family Cydnidae. There are about 15 described species in Melanaethus.

Species
These 15 species belong to the genus Melanaethus:

 Melanaethus anthracinus (Uhler, 1877)
 Melanaethus cavicollis (Blatchley, 1924)
 Melanaethus crenatus (Signoret, 1883)
 Melanaethus externus Froeschner
 Melanaethus mixtus Froeschner
 Melanaethus noctivagus (Van Duzee, 1923)
 Melanaethus pensylvanicus (Signoret, 1883)
 Melanaethus planifrons Froeschner, 1960
 Melanaethus punctatissimus (Signoret, 1883)
 Melanaethus robustus Uhler, 1877
 Melanaethus spinolae (Signoret, 1863)
 Melanaethus subglaber (Walker, 1867)
 Melanaethus subpunctatus (Blatchley, 1926)
 Melanaethus uhleri (Signoret, 1883)
 Melanaethus wolcotti Froeschner & Maldonado

References

Further reading

 
 

Cydnidae
Articles created by Qbugbot